The 1945 NCAA Swimming and Diving Championships  were contested in March 1945 at the Intramural Sports Building at the University of Michigan in Ann Arbor, Michigan at the ninth annual NCAA-sanctioned swim meet to determine the team and individual national champions of men's collegiate swimming and diving in the United States. 

Ohio State topped hosts, and rivals, Michigan in the team standings, the second team national title for the Buckeyes.

Team results
Note: Top 10 only
(H) = Hosts

See also
List of college swimming and diving teams

References

NCAA Division I Men's Swimming and Diving Championships
NCAA Swimming And Diving Championships
NCAA Swimming And Diving Championships